Paul James Krause (born February 19, 1942) is an American former professional football player who was a safety in the National Football League (NFL). Gifted with a great frame, speed and range, Krause established himself as a defensive force against opposing wide receivers. He led the league with 12 interceptions as a rookie before going on to set the NFL career interceptions record with 81 (which he picked off from 45 different quarterbacks) and was inducted into the Pro Football Hall of Fame in 1998.  Krause was selected eight times to the Pro Bowl during his 16 seasons in the NFL.

Early life
Krause attended and played high school football at Bendle High School in Burton, Michigan and earned all-state honors in basketball, football, baseball and track.  Known for once scoring 78 points in a basketball game, he was one of the few in his high school to ever receive an athletic scholarship.

College career
Krause attended and played college football at the University of Iowa.  He was a two-way starter as a wide receiver, running back, and defensive back.  As a senior in 1963, he tied the Iowa record with six touchdown pass receptions and was selected for the Senior Bowl, the East-West Shrine game, the Coaches' All-American game and the College All-Star game.  He finished his college career with 42 receptions for 718 yards, 49 carries for 263 yards, and 8 touchdowns.

Krause also played baseball at Iowa.  As a sophomore, he earned All-American honors and was drafted into the major leagues, but he turned down the offer.  Krause's chances to play professional baseball were ended when he injured his shoulder in his junior year playing football against the University of Michigan.

Professional career

Washington Redskins
Krause was drafted in the second round of the 1964 NFL Draft by the Washington Redskins.  In his rookie season, he led the NFL in interceptions with 12, including interceptions in seven straight games, and was named to the All-NFL first team.  He was named to his first of eight Pro Bowls and was second only to teammate Charley Taylor for the NFL Rookie of the Year award.

Although he intercepted 28 passes in his first four seasons with the Redskins, he was traded to the Minnesota Vikings for linebacker Marlin McKeever and a seventh-round draft choice in the 1968 NFL Draft.

Minnesota Vikings

Krause played with the Vikings until he retired after the 1979 season. During that time, he was one of 11 players to play in all four of the Vikings Super Bowl appearances (Super Bowl IV, VIII, IX, and XI).  Krause recorded an interception in Super Bowl IV and a fumble recovery in Super Bowl IX.

Krause was often referred to as the Vikings "center fielder" because of his success as an interscholastic baseball player and his ability to catch interceptions.

He currently holds the all-time interception record in the NFL with 81, which he returned for 1,185 yards and three touchdowns. He set the record in 1979 against the Los Angeles Rams, in the second quarter of a 27-21 overtime loss with his 81st interception coming in the final quarter. The previous record of 79 was held by Emlen Tunnell, another former Hawkeye who played for the New York Giants and the Green Bay Packers from 1948 to 1961.

Krause recovered 19 fumbles, returning them for 163 yards and three touchdowns.  Krause only missed two games due to injuries in 16 seasons.

After football
In 1994, Krause was elected to the Board of County Commissioners for Dakota County, Minnesota. He served for twenty years and he did not seek re-election in 2014.

Currently, Krause is involved in real estate development and insurance, and he owns several restaurants, including the Dairy Delite in Lakeville, Minnesota.  He previously owned a golf course in Elk River, Minnesota.

Krause was named to the Iowa Sports Hall of Fame in 1985, the Pro Football Hall of Fame in 1998, and the Boys & Girls Clubs of Sarasota County Sports Hall of Fame on May 7, 2004.

NFL career statistics

Personal life
Krause is married to his wife, Pam, and has two daughters, Mandi and Zendi, and one son, Blair.

In 1995, Pam Krause was severely injured in a car accident near their home in Lakeville, Minnesota when she was hit by a truck.  She spent five and a half months in a coma, but survived and is recuperating.

References

External links
 
 

1942 births
Living people
American athlete-politicians
American football safeties
Eastern Conference Pro Bowl players
Iowa Hawkeyes football players
Minnesota Vikings players
National Conference Pro Bowl players
Players of American football from Flint, Michigan
Pro Football Hall of Fame inductees
Washington Redskins players
Western Conference Pro Bowl players